KARM (89.7 FM), operating as Promise FM, is a Christian radio station broadcasting a Contemporary Inspirational format. Licensed to Visalia, California, United States, it serves the Visalia-Tulare area.  Until 2016, KARM's programming aired in Modesto and the San Joaquin Valley via its former sister station, KADV.  The station is currently owned by Harvest Broadcasting Company, Inc.

The callsign was also used for a station broadcasting on 1430 AM in Fresno, California as the ABC radio affiliate in the 1950s and 1960s.  At that time it was the second-oldest AM station in the Fresno market (after KMJ) having gotten its start on 1310 kHz with 100 watts in 1938.

References

External links

ARM